Cecilia Thomasson  is a Swedish mountain bike orienteering competitor and World Champion. She won an individual gold medal at the 2013 World MTB Orienteering Championships, and another gold medal in 2014.

References

Swedish orienteers
Female orienteers
Swedish female cyclists
Mountain bike orienteers
Year of birth missing (living people)
Living people
Place of birth missing (living people)
21st-century Swedish women